Hillsdale is a town in Columbia County, New York, near Hudson, New York and Great Barrington, Massachusetts. State Routes 22 and 23 intersect near the town center, which is listed on the National Register of Historic Places. The town has several restaurants and a general store, among other businesses. Hillsdale is known for its hilly landscape and is near Bash Bish Falls, Taconic State Park, and the Catamount ski area.  The Harlem Valley Rail Trail, a 26-mile bike path in two sections, is located not far from the intersection of Routes 22 and 23.

History 
Much of what would become the Town of Hillsdale was part of the Manor of Rensselaerswyck. Due to overlapping boundary lines, portions of the eastern part were claimed by the Province of Massachusetts.  Kakeout was established by settlers from New England who raised sheep. Around 1745, Martin Krum, is reported to have purchased 800 acres in the western portion of the town from the Van Rensselaer family. Robert Noble and his associates procured the Indian title to land about five miles square in the eastern part and called it Nobletown. The Van Resselaer's and the Livingstons leased land on their vast estates to tenant farmers, but those who had emigrated from Massachusetts did not recognized the landlords' titles. The dispute was not settled until 1773.

In 1776 Henry Knox passed through Hillsdale while transporting cannons from Albany, New York, to aid the Continentals in the siege of Boston. Two markers are posted in Hillsdale along the Henry Knox Trail.
 
This territory was taken from the Town of Claverack in 1782. The Columbia Turnpike was chartered by the state legislature in 1799. The road ran from the Massachusetts state line to the Hudson River port of Hudson as a way to bring farm produce, especially wool, rye, and wheat from the farm communities downriver to New York City. Revenues from tolls covered construction and maintenance. The East Gate tollhouse was located in Hillsdale. In 2016, it was listed in the National Register of Historic Places.

The Dr. Joseph P. Dorr House and Pine View Farm are listed on the National Register of Historic Places.

Geography

The eastern town line is the New York–Massachusetts border, along the Taghkanic Mountain range.

Demographics

As of the census of 2000, there were 1,744 people, 721 households, and 485 families residing in the town.  The population density was 36.6 people per square mile (14.1/km2).  There were 1,133 housing units at an average density of 23.8 per square mile (9.2/km2).  The racial makeup of the town was 97.88% White, 0.63% African American, 0.46% Asian, 0.52% from other races, and 0.52% from two or more races. Hispanic or Latino of any race were 1.61% of the population.

There were 721 households, out of which 28.4% had children under the age of 18 living with them, 54.0% were married couples living together, 7.6% had a female householder with no husband present, and 32.6% were non-families. 25.7% of all households were made up of individuals, and 10.7% had someone living alone who was 65 years of age or older.  The average household size was 2.42 and the average family size was 2.90.

In the town, the population was spread out, with 23.9% under the age of 18, 5.9% from 18 to 24, 23.1% from 25 to 44, 30.2% from 45 to 64, and 17.0% who were 65 years of age or older.  The median age was 43 years. For every 100 females, there were 98.9 males.  For every 100 females age 18 and over, there were 97.5 males.

The median income for a household in the town was $40,156, and the median income for a family was $46,250. Males had a median income of $30,893 versus $25,694 for females. The per capita income for the town was $27,186.  About 4.7% of families and 8.3% of the population were below the poverty line, including 8.5% of those under age 18 and 5.1% of those age 65 or over.

Communities and locations in Hillsdale 
Harlemville – The hamlet of Harlemville is located in the northwestern corner of the town on County Route 21. It is the home of Hawthorne Valley Farm Store and its Waldorf school. The Emmanuel Lutheran Church of Harlemville and Cemetery were listed on the National Register of Historic Places in 2002.
Hillsdale – The hamlet of Hillsdale is located on the southern border of the town, next to the Town of Copake. It is at the junction of state routes 22 and 23. The Hillsdale Hamlet Historic District was added to the National Register of Historic Places in 2010 due to its abundance of pre-1900 buildings, including the recently restored Hillsdale General Store and three historic inns: Hillsdale House, Mount Washington House, and a 1790 brick structure that formerly housed the Aubergine restaurant. The Hillsdale Hamlet Park offers playground equipment for children and a basketball court. The Roeliff Jansen Park, a state park run by the Town of Hillsdale, has miles of hiking and snowshoeing trails, a year-round Dog Run, many family events, and a summer program for children. Roe Jan Park hosts the weekly Copake Hillsdale Farmers Market in the summer and fall. The park is located on Route 22 in the town of Copake, approximately one mile south of the intersection of Routes 22 and 23. Across from the park is the Roeliff Jansen Community Library, which also serves the towns of Copake and Ancram. A recently opened extension of the Harlem Valley Rail Trail terminates in the hamlet. The 1.5-mile extension was paved in spring 2017.
North Hillsdale – A hamlet near the center of Hillsdale on Route 22, originally the location of Nobletown. The North Hillsdale Methodist Church was listed on the National Register of Historic Places in 2010.

Festivals and celebrations

The Hillsdale Hamlet Committee holds a community flea market in the Hamlet Park most summers, generally on Memorial Day weekend.

Notable people
James Agee, writer
Samuel Birdsall, US Congressman, studied law with Martin Van Buren
Squire S. Case, New York legislator
Peter Kane Dufault, poet
Anna Roosevelt Halsted, writer
John Krum, attorney, jurist, and mayor of St. Louis, Missouri and Alton, Illinois
Henry Augustus Loop, painter
John Cowper Powys, writer
Brian Denis Cox, Scottish actor, HBO Series "Succession", Broadway Play "Great Society", "Pretenders", "Strange but True"
Michael Lally, Irish American poet, actor

References

External links

 Town of Hillsdale official website

Towns in Columbia County, New York
1788 establishments in New York (state)